Roscoe Conkling Lockwood (November 22, 1875 – November 24, 1960) was an American rower who competed in the 1900 Summer Olympics. He was born in Upper Pittsgrove Township, New Jersey and died in Moorestown, New Jersey. Lockwood was part of the American boat Vesper Boat Club, which won the gold medal in the eights.

References

External links
 
 

1875 births
1960 deaths
Sportspeople from Salem County, New Jersey
Rowers at the 1900 Summer Olympics
Olympic gold medalists for the United States in rowing
American male rowers
Medalists at the 1900 Summer Olympics